A titular ruler, or titular head, is a person in an official position of leadership who possesses few, if any, actual powers. Sometimes a person may inhabit a position of titular leadership and yet exercise more power than would normally be expected, as a result of their personality or experience. A titular ruler is not confined to political leadership but can also reference any organization, such as a corporation.

Etymology
Titular is formed from a combination of the Latin titulus (title) and the English suffix -ar, which means "of or belonging to."

Usage
In most parliamentary democracies today, the head of state has either evolved into, or was created as, a position of titular leadership. In the former case, the leader may often have significant powers listed within the state's constitution but is no longer able to exercise them because of historical changes within that country. In the latter case, it is often made clear within the document that the leader is intended to be powerless. Heads of state who inhabit positions of titular leadership are usually regarded as symbols of the people they "lead."

Examples
Napoleon II was briefly titular Emperor of the French after his father's second abdication in 1815.
Emperor Shōwa of Japan remained as a titular ruler after the Japanese surrender in World War II.
The presidents of both Israel and Ireland have largely ceremonial duties and are regarded as titular leaders.
The President of China alone is largely ceremonial with limited power, when not simultaneously holding the CCP General Secretary position.

Not to be confused with "eponym"
A common confusion is with the word and concept eponym. This means that an institution, object, location, artefact, etc., takes its name or title from the particular person. For example, Simon Bolivar is not the titular ruler of the Bolivarian Republic of Venezuela but its eponym.

References

Titles
Political systems